Chakari (Cakaray, Chakaray) was a village in Khaki Jabbar District, Kabul Province, Afghanistan.  In the 1990s during the Afghan Civil War large portions of it were destroyed, and many people left. As of 2002 many of the former inhabitants had not returned.

A Buddhist pillar, known as the "Minaret of Chakari" was located there, and appears to have given the village its name. It was built in the 1st century AD. The pillar was heavily damaged during the Afghan Civil War, and was subsequently destroyed by the hardline Taliban regime in March 1998. In the 20th century, the inhabitants of the village were known for their expertise in breeding mules.

See also 
Kabul Province

Notes

External links
 "Chakari, Afghanistan" Falling Rain Genomics, Inc.
 "Chakari Map – Satellite Images of Chakari" Maplandia

Populated places in Kabul Province
Villages in Afghanistan